Connection is a split EP by the Orange County, California, rock bands Home Grown and Limbeck, released in 2000 by Utility Records. It resulted from a tour the previous year on which the two bands played together and became friends.

The EP was Home Grown's final recording with guitarist Justin Poyser and drummer Bob Herco, who both left the band in 2000.

Track listing 
Home Grown - "Promise Breaker"
Limbeck - "29 Times"
Home Grown - "Single All the Way"
Limbeck - "Invisible"
Home Grown - "She Don't Care"
Limbeck - "Rush Hour in Logtown"

Personnel 
Home Grown:
John "John E. Trash" Tran - vocals, guitar
Justin Poyser - guitar, vocals
Adam Lohrbach - vocals, bass guitar
Bob Herco - drums

Limbeck:
Patrick Carrie - guitar, vocals
Robb MacLean - guitar, vocals
Justin Entsminger - bass guitar
Matthew Stephens - drums
David Delfonzo - keyboards

Album information 
Record label: Utility Records
Mixed by Craig Nepp at Frontpage Studios and mastered by Charlie at Mono Phonix, both in Glendale, California.
Tracks 1, 3 & 5 produced and engineered by Craig Nepp and Home Grown at Frontpage Studios.
Tracks 2, 4 & 6 engineered by Kyle Homme at Pool House Audio and Literary Commissions in Fullerton, California, and produced by Limbeck.
Cover photo and design by Jamie from The Stereo
Photo of Matt from Limbeck drumming by Dave Rothenberg
All other photography by Dave Lauridsen
Layout and art direction by Robb MacLean and Adam Lohrbach

References 

Home Grown albums
Limbeck albums
2000 EPs